Pierfrancesco Pavoni (born 21 February 1963, in Rome) is a retired sprinter from Italy.

Biography
He won twelve medals at the International athletics competitions, four of these with national relays team and one of these at junior level. His greatest achievements were the 1982 European Championships silver medal as well as two World Indoor bronze medals.

His personal times were both achieved in 1986: 10.22 seconds over 100 metres and in 1987: 20.38 seconds over 200 metres. At 1983 World Championships he set the Italian record of the 4 × 100 m, winning another silver medal, with the teammate Pietro Mennea at the last relay.

Achievements

National titles
He has won 8 times the individual national championship.
3 wins in the 100 metres (1982, 1983, 1987)
2 wins in the 200 metres (1987)
1 win in the 400 metres (1985)
2 wins in the 60 metres  indoor (1985, 1987)

See also
 Italian all-time lists - 100 metres
 Italian all-time lists - 200 metres
 Italy national relay team
 Italy national athletics team - More caps

References

External links
 

1963 births
Living people
Italian male sprinters
Athletes (track and field) at the 1984 Summer Olympics
Athletes (track and field) at the 1988 Summer Olympics
Olympic athletes of Italy
Athletes from Rome
World Athletics Championships athletes for Italy
World Athletics Championships medalists
World Athletics Indoor Championships medalists
European Athletics Championships medalists
Mediterranean Games gold medalists for Italy
Mediterranean Games medalists in athletics
Athletes (track and field) at the 1983 Mediterranean Games
Italian Athletics Championships winners